Whorled milkwort is a common name for several plants and may refer to:
Polygala ambigua, flowering plant in the milkwort family first described in 1818 and native to the United States and Japan
Polygala verticillata, flowering plant in the milkwort family native to the United States and Mexico